In Demand (stylized as iN DEMAND) is an American cable television service which provides video on demand services, including pay-per-view. Comcast, Cox Communications, and Charter Communications (with former independent companies Time Warner Cable and Bright House Networks) jointly own iN DEMAND.

History

The origins of the service (which is/was unrelated to Canada's Viewers Choice) date back to 1978 and the well-known interactive television experiment in Columbus, Ohio, Warner-Amex Satellite Entertainment's QUBE system. Viewer's Choice started as one of ten channels on QUBE, with its name arising from the service presenting viewers one of five films to be aired on the channel with their QUBE remotes, though at that time, it was a multiple choice by viewer vote of which film would air on the channel space, rather than a selection of films. Viewer's Choice expanded with QUBE as the service launched in additional cities. Warner satellite-linked their QUBE systems, and Viacom, partnered at the time with Warner-Amex with the merger of their competing pay-TV services, Showtime/The Movie Channel Inc., joined the venture, adding Viewer's Choice to their own cable systems and eventually becoming the pay-per-view selection of channels under its now traditional concept.

The QUBE project was ended in 1985 among financial losses, resulting in the sale of the Warner-Amex assets to Viacom. The PPV arm was split off from the rest of the Warner-Amex assets (which became known as MTV Networks) and instead was placed under the Showtime/TMC division. The service was launched nationally via satellite to cable companies in six states on November 27, 1985, with one channel of pay-per-view content, still under the Viewer's Choice name. A second channel, utilizing cassette tapes delivered to cable operators, was also available; this eventually evolved into Viewer's Choice II in 1988, which has since been rebranded and refocused as the Hot Choice service. In 1989, Group W Satellite Communications bought a 50% stake in Viewers' Choice and Request TV.

Also in 1988, VC merged with a competing PPV service, Home Premiere Television, a joint venture of multiple cable companies. The service (which Viacom eventually gave up its stake in) retained the Viewer's Choice name, but utilized HPT's legal name, Pay-Per-View Network, Inc., until the rebrand to iN DEMAND.  Viewer's Choice continued to expand in the 1990s as it acquired other pay-per-view systems, along with cable companies deciding to outsource their pay-per-view systems rather than maintain them internally. As a result of this, as well as its various competitors gradually ceasing operations (including Cable Video Store and Request TV), the Viewer's Choice name was gradually phased out from on-air reference towards the end of the decade, generally only being referred to as "pay-per-view" in promos, on-screen graphics and voiceovers; the name remained in on-screen copyright graphics and on listings services such as the Prevue Channel until late 1999 when it was eventually renamed "PPV1".

Aside from Hot Choice, VC also operated 3 channels of programming under the brand of Continuous Hits; as the name implied, it offered one movie at all times of the day for a week-long period, as opposed to the mix of movies, sports and events found on the main Viewer's Choice network. Originating in May 1990 as a two-year test backed by Warner Bros., only available in certain areas (such as Comcast's Philadelphia cable systems) and fed by tapes delivered to cable headends, the service was expanded in February 1993 to a satellite-fed nationwide service, with two more Continuous Hits channels launched that summer. This brand was retired along with the Viewer's Choice brand itself in 2000, with the Continuous Hits channels becoming additional iN DEMAND channels.

On January 1, 2000, the service changed its name and on-air look to iN DEMAND. (The company had hinted towards rebranding as early as April 1999, when the schedules and offerings of their analog and digital services were consolidated.) The first program upon relaunch was Rave Un2 the Year 2000, a New Year's Eve concert performed by Prince, which was taped a couple weeks prior. Traditional analog service was eventually discontinued, and it is currently an all-digital service.

In addition to Hollywood films and a limited selection of adult films, along with live and recorded concert programming, the service mainly distributes ring sports through pay-per-view, including the events of the WWE, All Elite Wrestling, Impact Wrestling, Ring of Honor, boxing events through HBO Boxing and Showtime Boxing, and independent circuits such as those with lucha libre. It also distributes out-of-market sports packages such as MLB Extra Innings, NBA League Pass, MLS Direct Kick, NHL Center Ice where provided (and formerly distributed ESPN Full Court/ESPN GamePlan until they were brought in-house in 2015 as ESPN College Extra), along with Too Much for TV, a service which features 'uncensored' content from the series of American Television Distribution and NBCUniversal Television Distribution's tabloid talk shows. It was the former distributor of Howard Stern's Howard TV component of his self-titled Sirius XM radio show until 2013. The UFC ended their relationship with all traditional wireline pay-per-view providers with UFC 235 (including iN DEMAND), choosing to go with a new distribution model through ESPN+, which is now its exclusive pay-per-view provider as of April 2019.

Since this network's first inception, the first main Viewer's Choice/iN DEMAND channel (usually labeled as 'IN1' or 'PPV1' since 2000), signs off weekday mornings from 8AM to 11AM (Eastern Time) to feed promotions of upcoming movies and events of the next month to its headend affiliates. These are now sent digitally, though the channels continue to maintain routine maintenance periods in these low-purchased timeslots one or two days per month.

In 2010, iN DEMAND began providing a free movies on demand service, Vutopia, offered on Time Warner Cable and Bright House Networks. The service offered uncut older movies organized in themes. It was closed down on June 1, 2015.

As of early 2012, as cable providers use more channel bandwidth for high-definition, video-on-demand and broadband services which do not require starting films at several intervals on several channels, providers such as Spectrum and Xfinity have removed most of iN DEMAND's linear channels - beyond 1-3 standard-definition and one high-definition channel for mostly event programming - from their public channel lineups, though the service offers up to 31 standard definition and 19 high definition channels, many of which are used internally within cable companies to distribute content to their VOD servers. In Demand shut down its final three linear English-language movie channels on May 31, 2016, though a Spanish-language channel of rotating films and specials continues to air.

See also
Hot Choice (sister network)
Request TV
Cable Video Store
List of United States pay television channels

References

Television channels and stations established in 1985
Television networks in the United States
Charter Communications
Comcast
Cox Enterprises
1985 establishments in the United States
NASCAR on television